Reverie is a 2011 album by American singer-songwriter Joe Henry.  Mojo placed the album at number 50 on its list of the "Top 50 Albums Of 2011."

Reception

Reverie received positive reviews from critics. On Metacritic, the album holds a score of 81/100 based on 8 reviews, indicating "universal acclaim."

Track listing 
All tracks by Joe Henry except where noted
 "Heaven's Escape" — 4:54
 "Odetta" — 4:33
 "After the War" — 3:25
 "Sticks & Stones" — 4:50
 "Grand Street" — 4:53
 "Dark Tears" — 5:15
 "Strung" — 4:30
 "Tomorrow is October" — 4:34
 "Piano Furnace" — 4:27
 "Deathbed Version" — 3:24
 "Room at Arles" — 3:28
 "Eyes Out for You" (Henry, Richard Walters) — 5:16
 "Unspeakable" — 4:38
 "The World and All I Know" — 3:06

Personnel 
 Joe Henry —  vocals, guitar
 Keefus Ciancia —  piano
 David Piltch —  double bass
 Jay Bellerose —  drums
 Marc Ribot —  guitar, ukulele ("Dark Tears", Tomorrow is October" and "Deathbed Version")
 Patrick Warren —  pump organ, piano ("The World and All I Know" and "Dark Tears")
 Jean McLain —  backing vocals ("Odetta" and "Sticks & Stones")
 Lisa Hannigan —  vocals ("Piano Furnace")

References 

Joe Henry albums
2011 albums
Albums produced by Joe Henry
Anti- (record label) albums